Santa Must Be Polish and Other Christmas Sounds of Today is Bobby Vinton's thirty-third studio album and his second Christmas album, released in 1987. The title track is the only original song on this album.

Track listing
Side 1
 "Santa Must Be Polish" - (Bobby Vinton, Margie Cuthbertson) - 2:40
 "Jingle Bells" - (transcription by Bobby Vinton) - 2:45
 "Santa Claus Is Coming to Town" - (Haven Gillespie, J. Fred Coots) - 2:36
Side 2
 "Deck the Halls" - (transcription by Bobby Vinton) - 2:58
 "Silent Night" - (transcription by Bobby Vinton) - 3:31

Album credits
Produced by Bobby Vinton, Tom Kubis
Musical arrangements: Tom Kubis
Engineer: Hill Swimmer
Singers: Carol Jolin, Beth Lawrence

Bobby Vinton albums
1987 Christmas albums
Christmas albums by American artists
Pop Christmas albums